Darius Hodge (born July 3, 1998) is an American football outside linebacker for the Philadelphia Stars of the United States Football League (USFL). He played college football for the Marshall Thundering Herd.

College career
Hodge played for the Marshall Thundering Herd for four seasons and redshirted his true freshman year. He finished his collegiate career with 117 tackles, 20.5 tackles for loss, and 15.5 sacks. Following the end of his redshirt junior season, Hodge announced that he would forgo his redshirt senior season to enter the 2021 NFL Draft.

Professional career

Cincinnati Bengals
Hodge signed with the Cincinnati Bengals as an undrafted free agent on May 14, 2021. He made the Bengals' 53-man roster out of training camp. He played in four games before being waived on November 4, 2021.

Miami Dolphins
On November 5, 2021, Hodge was claimed off waivers by the Miami Dolphins. He was suspended two games on December 18 for violating the NFL's performance-enhancing drug policy.

On August 29, 2022, Hodge was waived/injured and placed on injured reserve. He was released on September 9.

Philadelphia Stars
On January 28, 2023, Hodge signed with the Philadelphia Stars of the United States Football League (USFL).

References

External links
Marshall Thundering Herd bio
Cincinnati Bengals bio

1998 births
Living people
American football linebackers
Cincinnati Bengals players
Marshall Thundering Herd football players
Miami Dolphins players
People from Wake Forest, North Carolina
Philadelphia Stars (2022) players
Players of American football from North Carolina